The 2018 Guzzini Challenger was a professional tennis tournament played on hard courts. It was the sixteenth edition of the tournament which was part of the 2018 ATP Challenger Tour. It took place in Recanati, Italy between 2 and 8 July 2018.

Singles main-draw entrants

Seeds

 1 Rankings are as of 25 June 2018.

Other entrants
The following players received wildcards into the singles main draw:
  Raúl Brancaccio
  Enrico Dalla Valle
  Giacomo Miccini
  Andrea Vavassori

The following player received entry into the singles main draw using a protected ranking:
  Daniel Brands

The following players received entry from the qualifying draw:
  Andrés Artuñedo
  Marcelo Tomás Barrios Vera
  Andrea Basso
  Aldin Šetkić

Champions

Singles

  Daniel Brands def.  Adrián Menéndez Maceiras 7–5, 6–3.

Doubles

  Gong Maoxin /  Zhang Ze def.  Gonzalo Escobar /  Fernando Romboli 2–6, 7–6(7–5), [10–8].

External links
Official Website

2018 ATP Challenger Tour
2018
2018 in Italian tennis